The 2022 season was Sport Club Internacional's 112th season in existence. As well as the Campeonato Brasileiro Série A, the club competed in the Copa do Brasil, the Campeonato Gaúcho and the Copa Sudamericana.

Internacional started the season under coach 'Cacique' Medina, but soon found itself in a bad situation after a sub-par performance in the Campeonato Gaúcho, being knocked out by rivals Gremio thanks to a 3–0 home defeat in the knockout round which the team was unable to turn around even after winning at the Arena do Grêmio in the 2nd leg.

Moreover, Inter managed to suffer one of the worst defeats of its history after being knocked out in the First Round of the Copa do Brasil to a 2–0 defeat to minnows Globo FC, pilling pressure on the team and Medina. The Uruguayan was sacked after a 1–1 draw at Beira-Rio vs Guaireña, prompting the hiring of veteran and Rio Grande do Sul-born Mano Menezes.

Under Menezes, the Colorado slowly managed to find consistency, also greatly after the signings of players like Wanderson, Carlos De Pena, Vitão, Renê, Gabriel, Pedro Henrique and Alan Patrick. Inter qualified to the Sudamericana quarterfinals, a campaign highlighted by a comeback vs Colo Colo with a big 4–1 win at Beira-Rio, but was eliminated on its home soil to Melgar on penalties.

Internacional soon piled good results in the Brasileirão and was constantly on the races for the top spot, but was unable to reach eventual champions Palmeiras and found themselves Serie A runner-ups once again, the fifth time it happened in the 21st century.

First team

Reserve squad

Transfers

In

Out

Competitions

Overview

Campeonato Gaúcho

League table

Matches

Knockout stage

Semi-finals

Copa Sudamericana

Round of 16 

The draw for the round of 16 was held on 27 May 2022.

Quarter-finals

Serie A

League table

Results summary

Results by round

Matches
The league fixtures were announced on 2 February 2022.

Copa do Brasil

First round

Statistics 
Player with no appearances not included on list. Matches played as a sub in parenthesis.

* Denotes a player that did not end the season at the club // ** Retired from football

Goalscorers

Assists

References

External links

Sport Club Internacional seasons
Brazilian football clubs 2022 season